Glad, Koonix! (subtitled Lee Konitz Live in Sweden) is a live album by saxophonist Lee Konitz which was recorded in Sweden in 1983 and released on the Dragon label.

Critical reception

The Allmusic review stated "Somehow Lee Konitz never sounds stale and his solos (even on tunes he had been playing for over 30 years) still have a strong amount of curiosity and wonderment in them. His fans will enjoy this fine straightahead session".

Track listing 
 "Hi-Beck" (Lee Konitz) – 7:15
 "Lover Man" (Jimmy Davis, Roger ("Ram") Ramirez, James Sherman) – 5:10
 "A Child Is Born" (Thad Jones) – 4:40
 "No Mind at All" (Göran Strandberg) – 6:00
 "Cherokee" (Ray Noble) – 8:05
 "Changing from Meter to Centimeter" (Strandberg) – 4:45
 "Body and Soul" (Johnny Green) – 9:20

Personnel 
Lee Konitz – alto saxophone, soprano saxophone
Jan Allan – trumpet
Utsava Göran Strandberg – piano
Sture Nordin – bass
Egil Johansen – drums

References 

Lee Konitz live albums
1986 live albums
Dragon Records albums